George Andrew Lister (6 November 1886 – 1 May 1973) was a Canadian long-distance runner. He competed in the men's marathon at the 1908 Summer Olympics.

References

1886 births
1973 deaths
Athletes (track and field) at the 1908 Summer Olympics
Canadian male long-distance runners
Canadian male marathon runners
Olympic track and field athletes of Canada
Sportspeople from Ontario